The Kalenjin languages are a family of a dozen Southern Nilotic languages spoken in Kenya, eastern Uganda and northern Tanzania. The term Kalenjin comes from an expression meaning "I say (to you)" or "I have told you" (present participle tense). Kalenjin in this broad linguistic sense should not be confused with Kalenjin as a term for the common identity the Nandi-speaking peoples of Kenya assumed halfway through the twentieth century; see Kalenjin people and Kalenjin language.

Branches
The Kalenjin languages are generally distinguished into four branches. There is less certainty regarding internal relationships within these.

Elgon (Sebei)
Nandi–Markweta (Kalenjin)
Okiek–Mosiro
Kipsigis 
Pökoot

Comparative vocabulary
Sample basic vocabulary of Kalenjin languages from van Otterloo (1979), and Proto-Southern Nilotic from Rottland (1982):

Footnotes

References
https://www.amazon.de/Kalenjin-Grammar-Beginners-Complete-Textbook-ebook/dp/B09VLL15M7
Distefano, John Albert. 1985. The precolonial history of the Kalenjin of Kenya: a methodological comparison of linguistic and oral traditional evidence. Doctoral dissertation, University of California at Los Angeles.
Rottland, Franz (1982) Die Südnilotischen Sprachen: Beschreibung, Vergleichung und Rekonstruktion (Kölner Beiträge zur Afrikanistik vol. 7). Berlin: Dietrich Reimer. (See esp. map 1 on p. 31, and the 'Sprachbeschreibung' of the Kalenjin languages on pp. 69–143.)
van Otterloo, Roger. 1979. A Kalenjin dialect study. (Language Data Africa Series, 18.) Dallas: Summer Institute of Linguistics.

External links

Kalenjin–English Dictionary
A Kalenjin website
Phonology of Endo - a Kalenjin language

 
Languages of Kenya